William Bonetemps (fl. 1430s – 1440s) was a Canon of Windsor from 1431 to 1442.

Career

He was appointed:
Rector of Littleton until 1431
Prebendary of the 10th stall in St Stephen's Westminster 1420 - 1431

He was appointed to the eighth stall in St George's Chapel, Windsor Castle in 1431 and held the canonry until 1442.

Notes 

Canons of Windsor